Tumbahangphe belong to the Limbu Indigenous Peoples of Eastern Nepal. They are originally from Tehrathum District. The major settlement of Tumbahangphe are in the hills, in places like Myanglung (headquarter of Tehrathum district), Taplejung, Dhankuta, Panchthar and Illam.

See also
Limbu clans and tribes

Indigenous peoples of Nepal